A cooling center is an air-conditioned public space set up by local authorities to temporarily deal with the health effects of extreme heat weather conditions, like the ones caused by heat waves. Cooling centers are meant to prevent hyperthermia caused by heat, humidity, and poor air quality. Cooling centers provide shade, water, and restrooms; medical attention and referrals to social services may also be offered. Their services are aimed at the homeless, those without access to adequate air conditioning and at-risk populations such as the elderly, children and those with mental disability or chronic medical conditions.

As the danger of heat waves has risen in the public consciousness, cooling centers are increasingly used in larger cities such as Los Angeles, New York City, Chicago, Boston, and Toronto, as well as less urban population areas. Cooling centers may also be used in places like Portland and Seattle where home air conditioning is rare but summer can bring temperatures exceeding  for several days. Similarly, during the 2018 European heat wave and fires that reached northern Scandinavia, a supermarket in Finland was temporarily used as a cooling center.

In general, cooling centers are implemented and operated by a variety of local actors such as municipalities, fire departments, county agencies, and non-profit organizations. They are usually sited at multiple locations throughout a municipality, such as public libraries, community centers, senior centers, and police stations. Another health measure sometimes taken during heat waves is to extend operational hours at public beaches and swimming pools.

As various studies have projected more intense, more frequent, and longer-lasting heat waves in the future, many state and federal governments in the US would be including cooling centers as part of their heat adaptation strategy and warning system.

See also
Warming center

References

 

Heating, ventilation, and air conditioning
Public health in the United States